A timpani concerto is piece of music written for timpani with orchestral or band accompaniment. It is usually in three parts or movements.

The first timpani concertos were written in the Baroque and Classical periods of music. Important concertos from these eras include Johann Fischer's Symphony for Eight Timpani and Georg Druschetzky's Concerto for Six Timpani. During the Romantic Period, the timpani concerto was largely ignored. The timpani concerto was revived in the 20th century and the timpani concerto repertoire increased significantly.

Timpani concerto set-ups can range anywhere from a normal set of 4(32", 29", 26", 23") to 16+ Drums, some of which are smaller than 20" or larger than 32".

List

Johann Christian Fischer 
Symphony for Eight Obbligato Timpani (probably 1780s), first known concerto for timpani
Georg Druschetzky
Concerto for Six Timpani and Orchestra (1790s)
Christoph Graupner
Symphony for 2 horns, timpani and strings
Werner Thärichen
Timpani Concerto Op. 34 (1954)
William Kraft
Concerto No. 1 for Timpani and Orchestra (1984)
Concerto No. 2 for Timpani and Orchestra ("The Grand Encounter") (2005)
Gordon Jacob
 Concerto for Timpani & Band (1984)
Kurt Schwertsik
Timpani Concerto (1987-88)
James Oliverio
Timpani Concerto No. 1 (The Olympian) (1990)
Dynasty (double timpani concerto) (2011)
Mauricio Kagel
Konzertstück for Timpani and Orchestra (1990-92)
Philip Glass
Concerto Fantasy for Two Timpanists and Orchestra (2000)
Russell Peck
Concerto for Timpani and Orchestra (Harmonic Rhythm) (2000)
Russell Peterson
Concerto for Timpani and Orchestra (2002)
Michael Daugherty
Raise the Roof (2003)
Ney Rosauro
Concerto for Timpani and Orchestra (2003)
James Boznos
Concerto for Timpani, Roto-toms and Orchestra op.7 (2003)
Concerto Nr.2 “Pavilions” op. 20, for extended timpani, orchestra and mp3 (2019)
Lee Actor
Concerto for Timpani and Orchestra (2005)
Jeff Tyzik
Concerto for Timpani (2009)
John Psathas
Planet Damnation for timpani and orchestra (2012)
Kalevi Aho
Concerto for Timpani and Orchestra (2015)
Marcus Paus
Concerto for Timpani and Orchestra (2015)
Nick Woud
 Timpani Concerto (Concerto Lirico) (2020)

References

Concertos
 
Concerto